A County Judge/Executive (or simply, Judge/Executive, and often written Judge-Executive) is an elected official in the U.S. Commonwealth of Kentucky who is the head of the executive branch of a government in a county. The Judge/Executive is an ex officio member of the Fiscal Court, the county's legislature. The position is established by the Kentucky Constitution, Section 144, and may not be abolished without amending that document. In other states, similar positions are often titled county executive or county mayor (or in Georgia, or neighboring Indiana, county commissioner).  In Texas, the county judge performs similar functions.

History
Before the Kentucky Constitution of 1850, the primary administrator of a county was the justice of the peace. The 1850 constitution provided for the office of a county judge, elected by the citizens. The county judge presided over certain county courts, most notably the court of claims, the forerunner of the fiscal court. 

The fourth state constitution, enacted in 1891, reorganized county governments into much of their present form. Judicial, legislative and executive leadership was provided for in the office of the county judge. A 1975 amendment to the constitution minimized the judicial roles of the county judge and maximized the legislative and executive roles. This amendment also changed the name of the office to County Judge/Executive.

Term and duties
The Judge/Executive serves a four-year term and may be re-elected indefinitely.  Though he wields no judicial power, the Judge/Executive is often informally referred to as "The Judge", is formally addressed as "Your Honor", and is styled as "The Honorable".  The Judge/Executive is the presiding officer and a voting member of the Fiscal Court, enabling him to exercise a role in the legislative process.

In Kentucky's consolidated city-county governments, premier executive power is exercised by either the Metro Mayor (i.e. Louisville) or the Urban-County Mayor (i.e. Lexington). The counties in which these cities reside retain, and fill by election, their offices of County Judge/Executive.

See also
 Fiscal Court

References

External links
 Kentucky County Judge-Executive Association